Hardiya is a village in Jagdishpur block of Bhojpur district, Bihar, India. It is located in the northern part of the block, near the border with Bihiya block. As of 2011, its population was 6,998, in 1,006 households.

References 

Villages in Bhojpur district, India